Iron Brew may refer to:

 Irn-Bru, a Scottish soft drink formerly known as "Iron Brew", the name still used by many rival/generic copies
 Iron Brew (South African soft drink), a  brownish half maroon coloured carbonated soft drink sold in South Africa and many other places